The One-T's ABC is a 2006 album by electronic/hip-hop/house project One-T released on the Polydor label.

Track listing 

 "Overture" – 0:51
 "U!!!" – 3:45
 "Tomorrow's War" – 3:59
 "Hamburguesa" – 3:03
 "Show Me U Can Do It" – 4:38
 "I Woke Up" – 3:31
 "Voulez-Vous des Bonbons" – 4:39
 "My Satisfaction (What About?)" – 4:49
 "Interlude" – 0:36
 "In Da T Club" – 4:09
 "Kamasutra" – 3:39
 "Low Low Loco" – 3:30

References 
 
 

2006 albums
One-T albums